Nchumbulu or Nchummuru is a Guang language of Ghana.
It is spoken in parts of Bono East, Oti, Northern and Savannah regions.

Resources

 Batibo, H. (2004). The role of minority languages in education and development in Africa. The language web: Essays in honour of Victor Webb, 26-33.
 Blench, R. (2007). Endangered languages in West Africa. Language diversity endangered
 Goody, Jack R. (1963). Ethnological Notes on the distribution of the Guang Languages. Journal of African Languages 2. 173-189.
 Edu-Buandoh, Dora Francisca. Multilingualism in Ghana: An ethnographic study of college students at the University of Cape Coast. ProQuest, 2006.

References

External links
 
 http://ugspace.ug.edu.gh/handle/123456789/5372
 

Guang languages
Endangered Niger–Congo languages
Languages of Ghana